Buoho is a town in the Afigya-Kwabre District of the Ashanti Region noted for the Buoho Grotto.

References

See also
Agbenohoe

Populated places in the Ashanti Region